The Richard F. Canning Trophy is presented annually to the team that advances to the American Hockey League's (AHL) Calder Cup Finals as the playoff winner of the Eastern Conference. Prior to 1998, it was given to the playoffs champion of the Northern Division/Conference.

The award is named after former AHL President Richard F. Canning, who served in that role from 1958 to 1961. He would serve the AHL in various roles for over five decades.

The current holders of the Canning Trophy are the Springfield Thunderbirds. The T-Birds captured the 2022 Canning Trophy by defeating the Laval Rocket in seven games in the 2022 AHL Eastern Conference Championship series.

Winners

Winner by season
Key
‡ = Eventual Calder Cup champions

References

External links
Official AHL website
AHL Hall of Fame

American Hockey League trophies and awards